The mayor of Bacoor is the head of the executive branch of city government of Bacoor, a first-class urban component city in the province of Cavite, Philippines. Like all local government heads in the Philippines, the mayor is elected via popular vote, and may not be elected for a fourth consecutive term (although the former mayor may return to office after an interval of one term). In case of death, resignation or incapacity, the vice mayor becomes the mayor. Twenty-one individuals have held the position since it was first established in 1908 during the American colonial period.

History

Pursuant to Chapter II, Title II, Book III of Republic Act No. 7160 or the Local Government Code of 1991, the Bacoor city government is to be composed of a mayor (alkalde), a vice-mayor (bise alkalde) and members (kagawad) of the legislative branch Sangguniang Panlungsod alongside a secretary to the said legislature, all of which are elected to a three-year term and are eligible to run for three consecutive terms.

Elected to a term of three years and limited to three consecutive terms, the mayor of Bacoor holds office at Bacoor City Hall within the Bacoor Government Center in Brgy. San Nicolas II. He appoints the directors of each city department, which include the office of administration, engineering office, information office, legal office, and treasury office.

The first city mayor of Bacoor is Edwin M. Bautista, from the Lakas Party. He first assumed office on 30 June 2007, following his victory in the May 2007 municipal elections. He was reelected in 2010 for a second term, during which, Bacoor was converted into a city. He ran and won a third as city mayor in 2013 which expired in 2016. Having served up to the constitutional limit of three terms, he ran and won as the city's representative in the Philippine House of Representatives, with his sister-in-law Lani Mercado-Revilla being elected as city mayor as his replacement. After Revilla served for two terms, she was reelected to the House of Representatives during the 2022 Philippine general election, with Bautista returning to city hall as the reelected mayor.

The city's vice mayor performs duties as acting governor in the absence of the mayor. The vice mayor also automatically succeeds as mayor upon the death of the incumbent and also convenes the Sangguniang Panlungsod, the city's legislative body. The city's first vice mayor was Rosette Miranda-Fernando, who was Bautista's vice mayor from 2007 to 2013. Councilwoman Catherine Evaristo replaced Fernando in that role having won during the 2013 Philippine general election and served in the role during the Bautista and Revilla administrations until she decided to run again as councilwoman in the 2022 Philippine general election, having reached the constitutional three-term limit. The incumbent vice mayor of Bacoor is Rowena B. Mendiola, who is also a former city councilwoman and Bautista's sister.

List of mayors

See also
 Bacoor

Notes

References

Bacoor
Lists of mayors of places in the Philippines